Kenta Asakura (朝倉 健太, born June 11, 1981) is a Japanese former professional baseball pitcher. Asakura played with the Chunichi Dragons from 2000 to 2015 and was employed as a pitching coach for the Dragons first team from 2016 to 2018.

External links

NPB.com

1981 births
Living people
Baseball people from Gifu Prefecture
Japanese baseball players
Nippon Professional Baseball pitchers
Chunichi Dragons players
Japanese baseball coaches
Nippon Professional Baseball coaches